Cassius Ricardo Duran (born May 31, 1979 in São Paulo) is a male diver from Brazil. He represented his native country at three consecutive Summer Olympics, starting in 2000 (Sydney, Australia). Duran won a silver medal at the 2003 Pan American Games in Santo Domingo, Dominican Republic.

Nowadays, Cassius is training at APOE, in Rio de Janeiro.

References

External links
 

1979 births
Living people
Brazilian male divers
Olympic divers of Brazil
Divers at the 2000 Summer Olympics
Divers at the 2004 Summer Olympics
Divers at the 2008 Summer Olympics
Pan American Games silver medalists for Brazil
Pan American Games medalists in diving
Divers at the 2003 Pan American Games
Divers at the 2007 Pan American Games
Universiade medalists in diving
Universiade bronze medalists for Brazil
Divers from São Paulo
Medalists at the 2005 Summer Universiade
Medalists at the 2003 Pan American Games
21st-century Brazilian people